A list of protected areas of Oman:

Ad Dimaniyat Islands 
Al Saleel National Park		 
Arabian Oryx Sanctuary
Jabal Samhan Nature Reserve	
Ra's Al Hadd Turtle Reserve
Khawrs of the Salalah Coast Reserve

References
World Database on Protected Areas
 Ministry of Environment and Climate Affairs Open Data Page on the Locations of Natural Reserves

 
Oman
Protected areas
Protected areas